{{DISPLAYTITLE:L-Streptose}}

-Streptose is a branched monosaccharide similar to apiose in structure. -Streptose is one of the sugars in streptomycin, an aminoglycoside antibiotic that has toxic effects in the kidney and other side effects.

-Streptose has been prepared from a carbohydrate derivative. The protected monosaccharide was reacted with an organolithium sulfur compound and then catalytically hydrolyzed to produce -streptose.

References

Monosaccharides
Deoxy sugars